The Yildirim Army Group or Thunderbolt Army Group of the Ottoman Empire (Turkish: Yıldırım Ordular Grubu) or Army Group F (German: Heeresgruppe F) was an Army Group of the Ottoman Army during World War I. While being an Ottoman unit, it also contained the German Asia Corps.

Starting in June 1917, the Yildirim Army Group's first commander in chief was the former Prussian Minister of War and Chief of Staff Erich von Falkenhayn. Von Falkenhayn was replaced by General of the Cavalry Otto Liman von Sanders on 25 February 1918. After the Armistice of Mudros on 30 October 1918, Mustafa Kemal took command until the Group's dissolution a few days later.

Tactics 
The army group included troops who used the latest Western-Front infiltration tactics; were equipped with close-combat gear, such as Stahlhelms and stick-grenades; and were supported by artillery and machine guns.

World War I

Order of Battle, August 1917 
In August 1917, the army group was structured as follows:
 Yildirim Army Group (Müşir Erich von Falkenhayn)
 Seventh Army, Syria (Mirliva Mustafa Kemal Atatürk)
 III Corps
 24th Division
 50th Division
 XV Corps
 19th Division
 20th Division
 German Asia Corps
 Sixth Army, Mesopotamia (Mirliva Halil Kut)
 XIII Corps
 2nd Division
 6th Division
 XVIII Corps
 14th Division
 51st Division
 52nd Division
 46th Division
with the
 42nd Division
 48th Division
 59th Division
 XX Corps at Huj
 16th Division
 54th Division
 178th Infantry Regiment
 3rd Cavalry Division
 XXII Corps at Gaza
 3rd Division
 7th Division
 53rd Division

Order of Battle, January 1918 
In January 1918, the army group was structured as follows:
 Yildirim Army Group (Müşir Erich von Falkenhayn)
 Seventh Army (Mirliva Fevzi Çakmak)
 III Corps
 1st Division, 19th Division, 24th Division
 XV Corps
 26th Division, 53rd Division
 3rd Cavalry Division
 German Asia Corps
 Eighth Army (Ferik Cevat Çobanlı)
 XXII Corps
 3rd Division, 7th Division, 20th Division
 16th Division, 54th Division, 2nd Caucasian Cavalry Division

Order of Battle, June 1918 
In June 1918, the army group was structured as follows:
 Yildirim Army Group (Müşir Otto Liman von Sanders)
 Seventh Army (Mirliva Fevzi Çakmak)
 III Corps
 1st Division, 24th Division, 3rd Cavalry Division
 XV Corps
 26th Division, 53rd Division, 19th Division
 German Asia Corps
 Eighth Army (Ferik Cevat Çobanlı)
 XXII Corps
 3rd Division, 7th Division, 20th Division
 16th Division
 54th Division
 2nd Caucasian Cavalry Division

Order of Battle, September 1918 
In September 1918, the army group was structured as follows:
 Yildirim Army Group (Müşir Otto Liman von Sanders)
 Fourth Army (Mirliva Cemal Mersinli)
 II Corps (Miralay Galatalı Şevket Bey)
 62nd Division, Provisional Division x 3
 Jordan Group
 24th Division, 3rd Cavalry Division
 VIII Corps (Miralay Yasin Hilmi Bey)
 48th Division, Umman Provisional Division
 Seventh Army (Mirliva Mustafa Kemal Atatürk)
 III Corps (Miralay İsmet İnönü)
 1st Division, 11th Division
 XV Corps (Miralay Ali Fuat Cebesoy)
 26th Division, 53rd Division
 Eighth Army (Ferik Cevat Çobanlı)
 XXII Corps (Miralay Refet Bele)
 7th Division, 20th Division
 Left Wing Corps (Oberst Gustav von Oppen)
 16th Division, 19th Division
 German Asia Corps
 2nd Caucasian Cavalry Division

After Mudros

Order of Battle, November 1918 
In November 1918, the army group was structured as follows:
 Yildirim Army Group (Mirliva Mustafa Kemal Atatürk)
 Second Army (Mirliva Nihat Anılmış)
 XII Corps
 23rd Division
 XV Corps
 41st Division, 44th Division
 Seventh Army (Mirliva Ali Fuat Cebesoy, deputy)
 III Corps
 11th Division, 24th Division
 XX Corps
 1st Division, 43rd Division

Yildirim Troops Inspectorate, May 1919 
In April 1919, Şevket Turgut Pasha, Cevat Çobanlı and Fevzi Çakmak hold a secret meeting in Constantinople. They prepared a report called "Trio Oath" (Üçler Misâkı) and decided to establish army inspectorate for the defense of homeland. In late April, Fevzi Çakmak submitted this report to the Minister of War Şakir Pasha. On April 30, 1919, the War Ministry and Sultan Mehmed VI ratified the decision about the establishing of army inspectorates that had been accepted by the Chief of General Staff And then the First Army Troops Inspectorate (stationed in Constantinople, Fevzi Çakmak), the Yildirim Troops Inspectorate (stationed in Konya, Cemal Mersinli, later Second Army Inspectorate) Inspectorate, the Ninth Army Troops Inspectorate (stationed in Erzurum, Mustafa Kemal Atatürk, later Third Army Inspectorate) was formed. Additionally, the Rumeli Military Troops Inspectorate (Nureddin Pasha) would be established and the XIII Corps would be under the direction of the Ministry of War. In May 1919, the army inspectorate was structured as follows:
 Yildirim Troops Inspectorate (Yıldırım Kıt'aatı Müfettişliği, Konya, Inspector: Ferik Cemal Mersinli)
 XII Corps (Niğde, Miralay Selâhaddin Bey)
 11th Division
 41st Division
 7th Cavalry Regiment
 20th Cavalry Regiment
 XX Corps (Ankara, Mirliva Ali Fuat Cebesoy)
 23rd Division
 24th Division
 XVII Corps (Smyrna, Mirliva Ali Nadir Pasha, transferred from the First Army Troops Inspectorate after the Occupation of Smyrna)
 56th Division
 57th Division

References

External links 

Army groups of the Ottoman Empire
Military units and formations of the Ottoman Empire in World War I